The 1887 United States Senate election in Pennsylvania was held on January 18, 1887. Matthew Quay was elected by the Pennsylvania General Assembly to the United States Senate.

Results
The Pennsylvania General Assembly, consisting of the House of Representatives and Senate, convened on January 18, 1887, to elect a Senator to serve the term beginning on March 4, 1887. The results of the vote of both houses are as follows:

|-
|-bgcolor="#EEEEEE"
| colspan="3" align="right" | Totals
| align="right" | 251
| align="right" | 100.00%
|}

See also 
 United States Senate elections, 1886 and 1887

References

External links
Pennsylvania Election Statistics: 1682-2006 from the Wilkes University Election Statistics Project

1887
Pennsylvania
United States Senate